João Uva de Matos Proença GColIH, KCMG (June 4, 1938-January 30, 1990) was a Portuguese diplomat who served in a number of posts, including as Ambassador to the United Nations, Ambassador to Canada and Director of Political Affairs at the Portuguese Ministry of Foreign Affairs.

References

1938 births
1990 deaths
Permanent Representatives of Portugal to the United Nations
Order of Prince Henry
Honorary Knights Commander of the Order of St Michael and St George
Portuguese diplomats
Portuguese nobility